The Kviven Tunnel is a  long road tunnel through the mountain Kviven, along the European route E39 highway.  The tunnel is located in Volda Municipality in Møre og Romsdal county, Norway.  The eastern end of the tunnel is at Kalvatn, just east of the village of Fyrde and the western end is at the village of Grodås.

The tunnel was approved for construction in 2008 and it was completed in 2012.  The tunnel was officially opened on 22 September 2012 by Liv Signe Navarsete, the Norwegian Minister of Local Government and Regional Development.  The tunnel is part of a new ferry-free route for the E39 highway.

References

Volda
Road tunnels in Møre og Romsdal